is a Japanese manga series written by Tensei Hagiwara and illustrated by Motomu Uehara and Kazuya Arai. It is a spin-off of  the main series Kaiji by Nobuyuki Fukumoto. It has been published in Kodansha's Weekly Young Magazine since December 2016. Part of the manga was adapted as segmented episodes within the Mr. Tonegawa: Middle Management Blues anime series.  A drama CD based on the series was included on the second DVD/Blu-ray Disc release of the series in March 2019.

Story
The story follows Ōtsuki, the foreman of Squad E in the underground forced labor camp for people in debt, as he uses one-day outside passes to leave the camp for a day. Usually, each trip involves food or drink in some way.

Characters

Main characters

The foreman of Squad E in the underground labor facility. While it is unknown where he is from, he speaks with a mixture of Kansai, Chūgoku and Shikoku dialects. He is a cunning individual who uses the privilege of being a foreman to profit from selling beer, sweets, and other goods, as well as a series of big cheating victories in the underground cee-lo games he hosts, and accumulates large amounts of perica (a currency that is only used underground) that he has taken from the prisoners. He frequently purchases "One-Day Outside Passes", a work incentive option, with the perica he earns. Though he is a skilled craftsman who can enjoy a day out without a care in the world using his accumulated experience and skills, he does not seem to want to permanently escape from the underground. He is portrayed as quite the gourmet in the story, and most of his outings are spent eating and sometimes going to public baths, exercise and short trips for refreshment. While he knows a number of good restaurants, he is cautious about choosing new places and menus to avoid getting a bad deal and having that regret linger for days, so he draws on his own observations and experiences in the areas he visits for the first time. When the mood is just right, he goes out for a drink at side street bars and enjoys socializing with strangers. Although his age is not specified, he explains that he was a college student in Tokyo 25 years prior (he lived a poor, simple life while working hard in a student band, and his favorite Chinese food restaurant at the time was in Kinshicho) and then worked as a company employee, but his appearance has changed little since his high school days, with the exception of his hair.

Ōtsuki's close aide. He is 35 years old and from Miyazaki Prefecture. He is emphasized as a "worldly-wise man" and "straight man" character who is pushed around by the actions of Ōtsuki and Isawa. Initially, he was not used to one-day outings and struggled to enjoy them. For this reason, he idolizes Ōtsuki, who enjoys his own dexterity, and often goes out of his way to match Ōtsuki's scheduled outings. In chapter 32, he becomes dissatisfied with Ōtsuki and Isawa for unknown reasons and goes on a sulking hunger strike (refusing to talk, eat or drink). Ōtsuki managed to put him back in a good mood, but Isawa's words and actions ended up adding fuel to the fire. Angered, he tried to return to the underground on his own before the time was up, but in the end he made up with Ōtsuki and Isawa through Miyamoto's tearful persuasion. In the special episode "One-Day Private Room Numakawa," he starts out happily enjoying the suite room he was sent to, which resembles a Japanese hotel, but soon finds himself bored and unsure of how to spend his time. The karaoke he asked for at the last minute was more fulfilling than he expected, and he sang "Sakuranbo" and other songs with great enthusiasm. However, Ōtsuki and Isawa made fun of him later because they could hear his voice from outside the suite.

Ōtsuki's close aide. He is 34 years old (he celebrates his birthday in chapter 29). He is emphasized as a "comic relief" and "trickster" character who baffles Ōtsuki and Numakawa with his explosive, optimistic personality and his self-centered behavior and actions. He was able to hit it off and work together with Ōtsuki thanks to their mutual love for the Bakumatsu era. He is also easily moved to tears, such as crying at the graveside of Sakamoto Ryōma and at the end of a documentary about animals. His family lived close to the ocean, so he knows a lot about fishing and has been doing it since he was a child. In chapter 73, he was the only one happy about the temporary suspension of underground work due to the new virus.

A young blacksuit who serves as the underground's overseer and has been with Teiai for six years. He is 30 years old and from Hakodate, living in a mansion on his own. Initially, he showed a strong distrust of Ōtsuki, who continued to win unnaturally in underground cee-lo. However, his self-control is provoked by a tour of the local government's showroom where he accompanies Ōtsuki, and eventually he and Ōtsuki drink together and develop a friendship. He begins appearing often after that, showing his trust for Ōtsuki by accompanying him on gourmet meals and sightseeing trips and taking care of him. He also shows his compassionate side by going out of his way to visit Ōtsuki when he catches a cold even on his day off, and by breaking down in tears when Numakawa almost breaks up with Ōtsuki and Isawa. He is a huge fan of foreign films and knows a lot about manga.

Underground labor facility

The foreman of Squad C in the underground labor facility. He imitates Ōtsuki and uses his foreman privilege to sell products in his squad as well. He is considered a rival by Ōtsuki because his "Hoppy Set" consisting of Hoppy and curry rice crackers was a huge hit, and he also hosts a thriving underground movie business that utilizes tablets. On the other hand, because he uses his outings to download videos, he is not as accustomed to being on the outside world as Ōtsuki (such as pronouncing "Wi-Fi" incorrectly and being hesitant to enter Miyuki, a small restaurant, because it seemed to have a lot of regulars). He has also been engaged in a spoiler battle for over a year with Ōtsuki to sneak in and divulge the story and outcomes of famous new movies and manga. However, it is also apparent that he is not always at odds with Ōtsuki, as when they try to watch One Cut of the Dead when they were both on an outing, they clacked their cups (paper cups from the movie theater, that is) in recognition of the difficulty they've both had with the spoilers spread out by the public to each other. In chapter 52, the screening of Rocky causes an underground muscle training boom. Ōtsuki took advantage of the boom by selling protein, boiled eggs, salad chicken and other weight training meals at high prices. However, it eventually goes too far and the film business begins to suffer more harm than good, so Odagiri tried to calm the situation down in cooperation with Ōtsuki, who was also affected, but it did not subside even after several months.

The foreman of Squad A in the underground labor facility. He is from Kumamoto Prefecture. Like Ōtsuki, he is a manga fan, and was shocked when the magazine Shōnen King stopped publishing. In chapter 42, he was found to be a two-time divorcee, and in chapter 61, it was revealed that he also had children. He wonders if the accumulation of habitual carelessness, such as his wife eating all of the pears that she has cut into 4-5 equal pieces without leaving any for the family, was the cause of the divorce.

The foreman of Squad B in the underground labor facility. He is from Ōita Prefecture. Like Ōtsuki, he is a manga fan, and like Itai, he was shocked when the magazine Shōnen King stopped publishing. In chapter 43, it was revealed that he had turned his own sales of goods, which had been in the red, back to profit with Lumonde, which he had acquired at the Bourbon draft conference.

A young worker from underground. He is constantly expressionless, but has the same gourmet taste as Ōtsuki. When he happened to be out on the same day as Ōtsuki, he went to the same restaurants and ordered the same food as Ōtsuki, and even impressed him with his peculiar toppings. Later on, he crossed paths with Ōtsuki again underground, and Ōtsuki could not help but ask for his name at the last minute.

Odagiri's close aide. He first appears in chapter 7.

A friend of Numakawa's from high school, who was sent into Squad E. Like Numakawa, he is from Miyazaki Prefecture, but unlike Numakawa, he often speaks in a Miyazaki dialect. His hobby is gambling, especially horse racing, which he is passionate about. Normally, he and Numakawa do not get along very well, but they played well together because of Yamamoto's presence. However, they drifted apart when Yamamoto changed schools and they all graduated from high school. Initially, he and Numakawa were uncomfortable because they had not seen each other for a long time, but because he was passionate about horse racing, he was able have a friendly talk about it with Numakawa and become friends with him even without Yamamoto. He goes outside for the first time in chapter 66. It is his first time in Tokyo and he is so excited that he speaks loudly in the train in a dialect, but Numakawa warns him about it. However, he encouraged Numakawa, who was depressed, and the two enjoyed sightseeing in Tokyo while speaking in the dialect together.

Numakawa and Kuroki's friend from high school. He was relatively versatile and had a personality that let him get along with anyone, and he was the reason Numakawa and Kuroki were playing so well together, but he had transferred to Tokyo to work in an entertainment production company. However, a week after Numakawa and Kuroki made friends with each other, he was sent underground and tried to chat with them about entertainment-related topics, but only made it more awkward for them.

A laborer who has been assigned to Squad E. Like Ōtsuki, he is an incomparable manga lover, and instead of working, he fell into debts he got from Teiai and was sent underground (a genuine manga freak, according to the narrator). He had a great time talking about manga with Ōtsuki, which also affected other foremen and Miyamoto, who had the same hobby.

A middle-aged laborer who appears in chapter 49. He tells everyone how he achieved an out-of-body experience and has been using it to go on outings without needing an outside pass for more than half a year. Ōtsuki and the others did not believe it, but when they tried to achieve it with the method they were taught out of curiosity, they actually succeeded.

One of the laborers who appears in chapter 57. He is from Saga Prefecture. He sits next to Numakawa at the "Kyushu People's Underground Gathering" and talks to Numakawa about the characteristics of Saga.

An aspiring comedian turned laborer who appears in chapter 50 of Mr. Tonegawa: Middle Management Blues and reappears in chapter 61 of this series. He was inadvertently mixed in with the candy-related talk by Ōtsuki and his team that had started by chance on the day of the inspection of the underground work. However, Ōtsuki did not know him and was inwardly puzzled. He claims the best cake is financier because it is "deadly delicious."

A popular actor. He played Buddy Red / Jin Nagatomo from the tokusatsu show "Friendship Squadron Buddy Rangers," but his co-star on the show, Jun Shiraishi, who played Buddy Blue, forced him into debt and he fell into the underground as a laborer in Squad C. He held handshake sessions underground, played Buddy Red, and shared potato chips given to him by the workers, all in the spirit of service. But when Shiraishi repaid all his debts to Teiai, his release from the underground was confirmed in just a few days, and he said goodbye to the workers.

Related Teiai Group persons

An old man who is the chairman of the Teiai Group. When it is his or his henchmen's birthday, the prisoners of the underground labor facility are treated to a special menu, and if he is in a good mood he may also present them new equipment, only to immediately confiscate it when his mood is spoiled.

One of the highest executives in the Teiai Group and protagonist of his own spin-off series Mr. Tonegawa: Middle Management Blues. He met Ōtsuki in "Tonegawa vs. Hanchō", a crossover collected in volume 5 of Tonegawa, and the two had to fight over a large bowl of katsudon.

One of the highest executives in the Teiai Group and a candidate for the No. 2 spot within the organization. He visits the underground labor facility and is shown around the area of Squad E by Miyamoto, but he notices and enjoys the fermented food made by Numakawa. As a result, he tries to take all of it away. Though he is stopped by Numakawa, his intimidating expression causes him to flinch, and he left underground with all the fermented food on hand.

One of the blacksuits. He is an unsocial, elderly man whose hobby is cooking. He has been making soba noodles for more than 30 years, so his skills are at the professional level. He also makes New Year's Eve soba that is served on December 31st, which even Ōtsuki admits tastes good. He has been serving as the food service manager since chapter 50, purchasing many relatively inexpensive ingredients on a limited budget, maximizing the use of the parts of the ingredients he purchases and serving the workers a quality menu. To him, it was just a hobby and a way to save money, but as a result, he was revered as the "Meal Messiah" by the workers, who remembered the joy of eating, and during regular personnel shifts, there was an uproar among the workers as to whether he would stay or be transferred. However, the workers were dismayed when the head of food service was dismissed during the handover period in chapter 67, and furthermore, the personnel shifts were confirmed the following week.

One of the blacksuits. He is a two-child single father living in Sendagi. He was once Miyamoto's supervising employee and is respected by his junior colleague Miyamoto. He is a regular visitor to the National Museum of Nature and Science and has an exclusive years-lasting free pass, taking his two sons there many times. He kept an eye on Ōtsuki and his friends as they stopped by the museum, but got irritated at their pretend-optimism as they were unaware of the scale of the renovated museum, and he showed them around the museum with enthusiasm and speed.

One of the blacksuits who used to be a pachislot employee. He became the new food service manager at the same time as Yanauchi's dismissal took place, but he is not a good cook. He is so determined that he eagerly tries to get Yanauchi to teach him how to cook.

Miscellaneous

The proprietress of a small restaurant named Miyuki. She has a methodical personality and cooks carefully and thoroughly (according to Ōtsuki, it is not the average cooking that "a plebeian runt" could achieve) and likes Western movies more than Japanese ones. When Ōtsuki first visited, he liked the food and the low price, and became a regular visitor to the restaurant, to the point that a bottle of shochu is kept there specifically for him. At the cherry blossom viewing camp, she was greeted by Miyamoto as special guest and served him sushi wrapped in fried tofu.

A former laborer from the underground labor facility. He is from Saga Prefecture. He has a caring and gentle nature and is well-liked by Ōtsuki and others. During the economic bubble burst, he got sent underground when he was over thirty years old and continued to spend his days there for nearly a quarter of a century until his sentence finally expired. However in the meantime, he had not been outside once and got his information exclusively from old newspapers and magazines, so his knowledge of the outside world, such as slang and incidents, was all outdated. He asked Ōtsuki to escort him for one day after his sentence expired due to his anxiety about going above ground (Kimura paid for Ōtsuki's pass), and although he was teased for his naivete by Ōtsuki and believing Ōtsuki's lies, he showed that he was willing to take a stand to protect Ōtsuki from being beaten up by a group of hoodlums. After that, he began working as a traffic manager and lives in an apartment along the Seibu Line, where Ōtsuki and his friends sometimes visit and stay. He falls in love with the middle-aged female employee of a large bakery.

Makita's first-born son. He visited the cherry blossom viewing camp with his father and brother. Numakawa taught him the rules of mahjong and they gave each other a thumbs-up when they said goodbye.

Makita's second son. He visited the cherry blossom viewing camp with his father and brother and bragged to the diner lady about the games he had brought with him, but he then gets tired of playing and falls sound asleep.

Numakawa's younger brother who is similar to him in both face and voice. He moves from Miyazaki to Tokyo for a job transfer and meets Ōtsuki's group who are waiting for him in front of Shinjuku station, where he meets his brother Takuya for the first time in six or seven years. He tells Ōtsuki and Isawa about his brother's true feelings at a bar and asks them to take care of him, but while Ōtsuki and Isawa are kind to him, his brother is hard on him. He later leaves the three of them with some money.

A hairdresser who previously wanted to be a novelist. He is 36 years old. He runs into Ōtsuki, who asked for an intestine stew. He tries to recommend Ōtsuki a Kendo Kobayashi-like hairstyle, which causes Ōtsuki's hair to look like Kobayashi's at the end of his outing. He chooses immortality immediately, given Nozaki's choices between immortality or dying now, but Nozaki points out that he does not understand true immortality. Later, he writes the first two lines of his novel, but falls asleep.

An art college student. He is 20 years old. He entered the drinking party after being amused by the talk between Ōtsuki and Obara. He draws a manga and tries to submit it for an award, but it is too overstuffed for a one-shot. However, he is praised by Ōtsuki. He forces the three of them to choose between immortality and dying now, but when Obara immediately chooses immortality, he points out that he does not understand true immortality. He is surprisingly a strong drinker. Later, he adds an immortality trait to the main character of the manga he drew, but the editor-in-chief points out that there is too much crammed into the manga.

A 42 year old mountaineer who entered the conversation when Obara wondered if Ōtsuki enjoyed his current job. He has been an aspiring alpinist since he was 30 years old and is trying to climb Mt. Everest. He is good at Japanese.

A boy's female pet dog who gets named by Ōtsuki. She encounters Ōtsuki, who is released on an outing, in Tokyo Park after she gets separated from her owner for an unknown reason. Ōtsuki tames her, but she is surprisingly gluttonous and does not know any commands besides "wait". Eventually she is reunited with her owner and his father just before Ōtsuki's time runs out. She tries to follow him as he is taken back underground, but stops and sees him off when he gives her the "wait" command.

Publication
1-nichi Gaishutsuroku Hanchō written by Tensei Hagiwara and illustrated by Motomu Uehara and Kazuya Arai. It began serialization in the combined 4th and 5th issue of Kodansha's Weekly Young Magazine published on December 26, 2016. Kodansha has collected its chapters into individual tankōbon volumes. The first volume was published on June 6, 2017. As of October 6, 2022, fourteen volumes have been released.

Volume list

Reception
1-nichi Gaishutsuroku Hanchō  ranked 2nd on Manga Shimbun Taishō in 2017. The series ranked 8th on Takarajimasha Kono Manga ga Sugoi!s top 20 manga for male readers 2018.

References

Further reading

External links
 

Anime series based on manga
Anime spin-offs
Comedy anime and manga
Comics spin-offs
Cooking in anime and manga
Kaiji (manga)
Kodansha manga
Nobuyuki Fukumoto
Seinen manga